George Francis Hotz (born October 2, 1989), alias geohot, is an American security hacker, entrepreneur, and software engineer. He is known for developing iOS jailbreaks, reverse engineering the PlayStation 3, and for the subsequent lawsuit brought against him by Sony. Since September 2015, he has been working on his vehicle automation machine learning company comma.ai.

Education 
He attended the Academy for Engineering and Design Technology at the Bergen County Academies, a magnet public high school in Hackensack, New Jersey. Hotz is an alumnus of the Johns Hopkins Center for Talented Youth program. Hotz also briefly attended Rochester Institute of Technology and Carnegie Mellon University.

Security research

iOS 
In August 2007, seventeen-year-old George Hotz became the first person reported to remove the SIM lock on an iPhone. He traded his second unlocked 8 GB iPhone to Terry Daidone, the founder of CertiCell, for a Nissan 350Z and three 8 GB iPhones.

In October 2009, Hotz released blackra1n. It was compatible with all iPhone and iPod Touch devices running iOS 3.1.2.

On July 13, 2010, Hotz announced the discontinuation of his jailbreaking activities, citing demotivation over the technology and the unwanted personal attention. Nevertheless, he continued to release new software-based jailbreak techniques until October 2010.

PlayStation 3 
In December 2009, Hotz announced his initial intentions to breach security on the PlayStation 3. On January 22, 2010, he announced that he had performed his first achievement consisting of read and write access to the machine's system memory as well as hypervisor level access to the machine's CPU.

On January 26, 2010, Hotz released the exploit to the public. On March 28, 2010, Sony responded by announcing their intention to release a PlayStation 3 firmware update that would remove the OtherOS feature from all models, a feature that was already absent on the newer Slim revisions of the machine.

On July 13, 2010, Hotz posted a message on his Twitter account stating that he had abandoned his efforts.

Sony lawsuit 
On December 29, 2010, hacking group fail0verflow did a presentation at the 27th Chaos Communications Congress where they exposed a mistake of Sony in their usage of ECDSA signatures without publishing the corresponding private key. This key was used by Sony to prevent piracy. On January 2, 2011, Hotz posted a copy of the private key of the PlayStation 3 on his website. These keys were later removed from his website as a result of legal action by Sony against fail0verflow and Hotz. In response to his continued publication of PS3 exploit information, Sony filed on January 11, 2011, for an application for a temporary restraining order (TRO) against him in the US District Court of Northern California.

Hotz published his commentary on the case, including a song about the "disaster" of Sony. Sony in turn has demanded that social media sites, including YouTube, hand over IP addresses of people who visited Geohot's social pages and videos, the latter being the case only for those who "watched the video and 'documents reproducing all records or usernames and IP addresses that have posted or published comments in response to the video".

PayPal granted Sony access to Geohot's PayPal account, and the judge of the case granted Sony permission to view the IP addresses of everyone who visited geohot.com. In April 2011, it was revealed that Sony and Hotz had settled the lawsuit out of court, on the condition that Hotz would never again resume any hacking work on Sony products.

Android 
In June 2014, Hotz published a root exploit software hack for Samsung Galaxy S5 devices used in the US market. The exploit is built around the CVE-2014-3153 vulnerability, which was discovered by hacker Pinkie Pie, and it involves an issue in the Futex subsystem that in turn allows for privilege escalation. The exploit, known as towelroot, was designated as a "one-click Android rooting tool".

Although originally released for the Verizon Galaxy S5, the root exploit was made compatible with most Android devices available at that time. For example, it was tested and found to work with the AT&T Galaxy S5, Nexus 5, and Galaxy S4 Active. Updates continued to be applied to the root exploit to increase its capabilities with other devices running Android. Updates to the Android operating system closed the source of the exploit. Samsung officially responded to the towelroot exploit by releasing updated software designed to be immune from the exploit.

Career 
Hotz made a meaningful side income from public donations solicited for his security exploits.

Hotz worked at Facebook between May 2011 and January 2012.

On July 16, 2014, Google hired Hotz to work with the Project Zero team where he developed Qira for dynamically analysing application binaries.

Hotz was employed at the startup Vicarious from January until July 2015.

comma.ai 

Hotz founded his AI startup, comma.ai, in September 2015. In an interview with Bloomberg, Hotz revealed that the company was building vehicular automation technology based on machine learning algorithms. Hotz built a working self-driving 2016 Acura ILX, which he demonstrated on California's Interstate 280 freeway in a video, resulting in a cease and desist letter from the California Department of Motor Vehicles.

Hotz wanted to sell his technology to Tesla Motors, meeting with CEO Elon Musk. Hotz claims that Musk offered him $12 million (minus $1 million for every month it took Hotz to work on the task) to create a driving system that could replace the MobilEye solution that Tesla used at the time. Tesla later released a statement on their website citing corrections to the Bloomberg article, stressing that their autopilot system was developed in-house, with a vision chip component from MobilEye, instead of one separate autopilot system manufactured by MobilEye, as suggested by Bloomberg reporter Ashlee Vance. Musk offered advice on Hotz's self-driving car project in a December 2015 interview.

On October 27, 2016, the NHTSA informed Hotz that the product was legally required to comply with Federal Motor Vehicle Safety Standards, and requested information that would confirm such compliance. A day later, George Hotz tweeted from Shenzhen that the comma one was cancelled. Kristen Lee stated on Jalopnik that the NHTSA was simply trying to open a dialog, and commented: "Instead, they got the worst attitude possible from Silicon Valley: try and regulate us, thought leaders, and we’ll take our ball and go home."

comma.ai open sourced their self driving car software (called openpilot) on November 30, 2016, emphasizing its intended use for research without a warranty.

On September 14, 2018, comma.ai announced Hotz would become the Head of Research Team for the project, and appointed Riccardo Biasini as the new CEO of the company. He left in March 2019, but returned in May 2019 to become president once again.

On January 7, 2020, comma.ai debuted its $999 comma two ADAS (driver-assist) device at the annual CES tech show in Las Vegas.

On August 23, 2022, comma.ai was sued by "patent troll" Sucxess LLC.

On October 31, 2022, Hotz said he is taking some time away from comma.ai.

Post-comma.ai 

Hotz then founded the tiny corp on November 5, 2022. The tiny corp aims to port machine learning instruction sets to hardware accelerators.

On November 18, 2022, Hotz announced that he had been hired by Twitter for a 12 week internship. On December 20, after less than 5 weeks at the role, he resigned.

Other activities and recognition
Hotz was a finalist at the 2004 ISEF competition in Portland, Oregon with his project "The Mapping Robot". Recognition included interviews on the Today Show and Larry King. Hotz was a finalist at the 2005 ISEF competition, with his project "The Googler".

Hotz competed in the 2007 Intel International Science and Engineering Fair, a science competition for high school students, where his 3D imaging project, entitled "I want a Holodeck", received awards and prizes in several categories including a $20,000 Intel scholarship. He travelled to Sweden to speak about the project at the Stockholm International Youth Science Seminar.

In March 2008, PC World listed Hotz as one of the top 10 Overachievers under 21.

In August 2013, Hotz attended DEF CON with Carnegie Mellon's Plaid Parliament of Pwning (PPP). PPP placed first in the DEF CON Capture the Flag (CTF) tournament. Later in 2013, Hotz also competed in CSAW 2013. Working alone, Hotz took first place under the pseudonym tomcr00se. In August 2014, Hotz once again competed as part of Carnegie Mellon's Plaid Parliament of Pwning to win the DEF CON CTF tournament for a second year in a row. The team also won the DEF CON "Crack Me If You Can" tournament.

In 2013, Hotz began making hip hop music on his SoundCloud, tomcr00se. As of June 2021, he has made 28 original songs and covers.

Hotz also has a Twitch channel, where he frequently does programming livestreams. As of September 2022, his twitch channel has over 62k followers.

In February 2020, Hotz founded the cheapETH crypto currency.

References

External links

1989 births
American bloggers
Living people
People from Glen Rock, New Jersey
Computer security specialists
Facebook employees
Google employees